Elections to Limavady Borough Council were held on 7 June 2001 on the same day as the other Northern Irish local government elections. The election used three district electoral areas to elect a total of 15 councillors.

Election results

Note: "Votes" are the first preference votes.

Districts summary

|- class="unsortable" align="centre"
!rowspan=2 align="left"|Ward
! % 
!Cllrs
! % 
!Cllrs
! %
!Cllrs
! %
!Cllrs
! % 
!Cllrs
!rowspan=2|TotalCllrs
|- class="unsortable" align="center"
!colspan=2 bgcolor="" | SDLP
!colspan=2 bgcolor="" | Sinn Féin
!colspan=2 bgcolor="" | UUP
!colspan=2 bgcolor="" | DUP
!colspan=2 bgcolor="white"| Others
|-
|align="left"|Bellarena
|bgcolor="#99FF66"|41.2
|bgcolor="#99FF66"|2
|15.3
|1
|24.7
|1
|18.8
|1
|0.0
|0
|5
|-
|align="left"|Benbradagh
|21.0
|1
|bgcolor="#008800"|50.3
|bgcolor="#008800"|3
|0.0
|0
|5.1
|0
|23.6
|1
|5
|-
|align="left"|Limavady Town
|22.7
|1
|8.9
|0
|21.1
|2
|bgcolor="#D46A4C"|30.3
|bgcolor="#D46A4C"|1
|17.0
|1
|5
|-
|- class="unsortable" class="sortbottom" style="background:#C9C9C9"
|align="left"| Total
|28.8
|4
|24.9
|4
|15.4
|3
|17.8
|2
|13.1
|2
|15
|-
|}

District results

Bellarena

1997: 3 x SDLP, 2 x UUP
2001: 2 x SDLP, 1 x UUP, 1 x DUP, 1 x Sinn Féin
1997-2001 Change: DUP and Sinn Féin gain from UUP and SDLP

Benbradagh

1997: 2 x UUP, 2 x SDLP, 1 x Sinn Féin
2001: 3 x Sinn Féin, 1 x United Unionist, 1 x SDLP
1997-2001 Change: Sinn Féin (two seats) gain from UUP and SDLP, United Unionist leaves UUP

Limavady Town

1997: 2 x UUP, 2 x SDLP, 1 x DUP
2001: 2 x UUP, 1 x DUP, 1 x SDLP, 1 x Independent
1997-2001 Change: Independent gain from SDLP

References

Limavady Borough Council elections
Limavady